Chibit (Çibit) is a rural locality (a selo) in Ulagansky District, the Altai Republic, Russia. The population was 622 as of 2016. There are 11 streets.

Geography 
Chibit is located 63 km southwest of Ulagan (the district's administrative centre) by road. Aktash is the nearest rural locality.

References 

Rural localities in Ulagansky District